The Deutsche Digitale Bibliothek (German Digital Library) or DDB is a virtual library in the German language which networks 30,000 cultural and research institutions and aims to make them freely accessible to the public using a common platform. A beta version of the portal with, according to its own information, about 5.6 million objects, went online on 28 November 2012. The first full version was launched on 31 March 2014. The aim is to integrate the DDB into Europeana at the European level.

Literature

References

External links 
 
 Deutsche Digitale Bibliothek bei Twitter und Facebook
 Dokumentation des API der Deutschen Digitalen Bibliothek
 Portal für Datenpartner der Deutschen Digitalen Bibliothek
 Informationen der Bundesregierung zur Deutschen Digitalen Bibliothek
 Mirko Smiljanic: Per Mausklick zum nationalen Kulturerbe. Die Deutsche Digitale Bibliothek geht ans Netz In: Deutschlandfunk (DLF). Hintergrund Politik. 27 November 2012. Retrieved 28 November 2012.
 Homepage des Archivportals-D, der spartenspezifische Zugang zu Archivdaten der Deutschen Digitalen Bibliothek.

German digital libraries
Publications established in 2012
Libraries established in 2012